Murdannia is a genus of annual or perennial monocotyledonous flowering plants in the family Commelinaceae.

The genus is one of the largest in the family. They are most easily distinguished from other genera in the family by their three-lobed or spear-shaped antherodes (i.e. non-functional anthers). Also, along with the closely related genus Anthericopsis, it is the only genus with staminodes (i.e. non-functional stamens) opposite the petals.

Murdannia are found in tropical regions across the globe with extensions into warm temperate areas. Typically, Murdannia species are found in open areas in mesic soils. However, some are semi-aquatic, and a limited few are found in closed forest situations. Three species are naturalized in the United States (Murdannia keisak, M. nudiflora and M. spirata).

The genus is named in honor of Murdan Ali, a plant collector who worked for John Forbes Royle and maintained the herbarium at Saharunpore, India. He was a munshi who took a keen interest in natural history and under the training of Falconer, Royle and Edgeworth had become a proficient botanist who compiled a vernacular flora of northern India and the Himalayas which was however never published.

 Species
 Murdannia acutifolia (Lauterb. & K.Schum.) Faden  - New Guinea
 Murdannia allardii (De Wild.) Brenan - Congo-Brazzaville, Zaïre
 Murdannia assamica Nampy & Ancy - Assam
 Murdannia audreyae Faden - Sri Lanka
 Murdannia axillaris Brenan - Kenya, Zanzibar, Pemba
 Murdannia blumei (Hassk.) Brenan - Indian Subcontinent, Java, Myanmar, Malaya
 Murdannia bracteata (C.B.Clarke) J.K.Morton ex D.Y.Hong - southern China, Laos, Thailand, Vietnam
 Murdannia brownii Nandikar & Gurav - western India
 Murdannia citrina D.Fang - Guangxi in China
 Murdannia clandestina (Ridl.) Faden - Peninsular Malaysia
 Murdannia clarkeana Brenan - Central African Republic, Chad, Kenya
 Murdannia crocea (Griff.) Faden - India, Andaman and Nicobar Islands, Myanmar
 Murdannia cryptantha Faden - New Guinea, Queensland, Northern Territory of Australia
 Murdannia dimorpha (Dalzell) G.Brückn. - southern India
 Murdannia dimorphoides Faden - Sri Lanka
 Murdannia divergens (C.B.Clarke) G.Brückn. - southern China, Himalayas, Myanmar, Vietnam
 Murdannia edulis (Stokes) Faden - southern China, Himalayas, Indochina, Java, Bali, Philippines, New Guinea
 Murdannia esculenta (Wall. ex C.B.Clarke) R.S.Rao & Kammathy - India, Sri Lanka
 Murdannia fadeniana Nampy & Joby - Kerala State in India
 Murdannia fasciata (Warb. ex K.Schum. & Lauterb.) G.Brückn.  - New Guinea
 Murdannia gardneri (Seub.) G.Brückn. - Brazil
 Murdannia gigantea (Vahl) G.Brückn. - Madagascar, Indian Subcontinent, Southeast Asia, New Guinea, Queensland, Northern Territory, New South Wales
 Murdannia glauca (Thwaites ex C.B.Clarke) G.Brückn. - India, Sri Lanka
 Murdannia graminea (R.Br.) G.Brückn. - Vietnam, Queensland, Northern Territory, New South Wales, Western Australia
 Murdannia hookeri (C.B.Clarke) G.Brückn. - Assam, southern China
 Murdannia japonica (Thunb.) Faden - China, Japan, Indian Subcontinent, Indochina, Borneo
 Murdannia juncoides (Wight) R.S.Rao & Kammathy - Kerala + Tamil Nadu in India
 Murdannia kainantensis (Masam.) D.Y.Hong - southern China
 Murdannia keisak (Hassk.) Hand.-Mazz. - Japan, Korea, Ryukyu Islands, Russia (Amur + Primorye), Taiwan, Laos, Vietnam, Nepal; naturalized in parts of United States
 Murdannia lanceolata (Wight) Kammathy - India, Sri Lanka
 Murdannia lanuginosa (Wall. ex C.B.Clarke) G.Brückn. - southern India
 Murdannia loriformis (Hassk.) R.S.Rao & Kammathy - China, Taiwan, Tibet, Ryukyu Islands, Bonin Islands, Indian Subcontinent, Indochina, Java, Philippines, New Guinea
 Murdannia macrocarpa D.Y.Hong - Yunnan, Guangdong, Cambodia
 Murdannia medica (Lour.) D.Y.Hong - Yunnan, Guangdong, Cambodia, Thailand, Vietnam
 Murdannia nudiflora (L.) Brenan - southern China, Indian Subcontinent, Southeast Asia, New Guinea, Western Australia, Micronesia; naturalized in Hawaii, southeastern United States, Mexico, Central America, West Indies, northern South America, Sierra Leone, Congo-Brazzaville, Cook Islands
 Murdannia paraguayensis (C.B.Clarke ex Chodat) G.Brückn. - Paraguay, Brazil
 Murdannia pauciflora (G.Brückn.) G.Brückn. - southern India
 Murdannia sahyadrica Ancy & Nampy - Maharashtra
 Murdannia satheeshiana Joby, Nisha & Unni - southern India
 Murdannia schomburgkiana (Kunth) G.Brückn. - Guyana, Brazil
 Murdannia semifoliata(C.B.Clarke ex S.Moore) G.Brückn. - Brazil
 Murdannia semiteres (Dalzell) Santapau - Zaire, Burundi, Rwanda, Kenya, Tanzania, Uganda, Zambia, Iran, Yemen, India, Vietnam 
 Murdannia simplex (Vahl) Brenan - sub-Saharan Africa, Madagascar, Indian Subcontinent, southern China, Indochina, Queensland
 Murdannia spectabilis (Kurz) Faden - southern China, Indochina, Philippines
 Murdannia spirata (L.) G.Brückn. - southern China, Indian Subcontinent, Indochina,  Java, Philippines; naturalized in Florida + Samoa
 Murdannia stenothyrsa (Diels) Hand.-Mazz. - Sichuan, Yunnan
 Murdannia striatipetala Faden - Sri Lanka
 Murdannia stricta Brenan - Zaire, Rwanda
 Murdannia tenuissima (A.Chev.) Brenan - tropical Africa
 Murdannia triquetra (Wall. ex C.B.Clarke) G.Brückn. - southern China, Indochina, Himalayas
 Murdannia undulata D.Y.Hong - Yunnan
 Murdannia ugemugei Kamble, Somkuwar et Nandikar - India
 Murdannia vaginata (L.) G.Brückn. - southern China, Indian Subcontinent, Indochina, Java, Philippines, Queensland, Northern Territory
 Murdannia versicolor (Dalzell) G.Brückn. - India, Vietnam, Philippines
 Murdannia yunnanensis D.Y.Hong - Yunnan
 Murdannia zeylanica (C.B.Clarke) G.Brückn. - India, Sri Lanka

References

 

Commelinaceae
Commelinales genera